"Maybe" is a song by American singer Toni Braxton from her third studio album, The Heat (2000). It was released to urban adult contemporary radio in the United States on February 6, 2001, as the album's fourth and final single.

Music video
The music video for "Maybe", directed by Chris Robinson, remained unreleased as Braxton felt it was too risqué. The treatment saw Braxton arriving home from the 2001 Grammy Awards ceremony after winning the award for Best Female R&B Vocal Performance for "He Wasn't Man Enough". She enters in the infamous dress and begins to undress while a peeper (played by James C. Mathis III) looks in. Although the video was never released, Braxton shows a clip of the never-before-seen video on her DVD From Toni with Love: DVD Collection. It was later leaked onto YouTube with the unreleased video for "The Heat" following it.

Track listings
US promotional CD single
"Maybe" (Radio Edit) – 3:08
"Maybe" (Instrumental) – 3:08
"Maybe" (Call Out Research Hook) – 0:10

US promotional 12-inch single
A1. "Maybe" (HQ² Club Mix) – 8:30
A2. "Maybe" (HQ² Radio Mix) – 3:33
B. "Maybe" (Dynamix NYC Club Mix) – 8:07

Charts

References

2000 songs
2001 singles
Arista Records singles
LaFace Records singles
Music videos directed by Chris Robinson (director)
Songs written by Keith Crouch
Songs written by Toni Braxton
Toni Braxton songs